Shetland HVDC Connection is a high-voltage direct current submarine power cable under construction to connect Shetland to the British mainland.

Current status
In April 2022, the project was described as "on track to be completed by 2024". 

The subsea cable installation is ongoing, and expected to continue until 2023.

Route
The interconnector starts at the Upper Kergord Valley converter station in Shetland. From the converter station an underground cable runs to a landing area in Weisdale Voe. From there, a subsea cable runs to landfall at Noss Head in Caithness, with onward connection to an HVDC switching station north of the village of Staxigoe in Caithness.

The route of the cable crosses TAT-10, TAT-14 and Atlantic Crossing 1 telecommunication cables and the Piper–Flotta oil pipeline.

Technical description
The interconnector will connect to the existing 320kV Caithness - Moray Link to form a three terminal HVDC network, with converter stations at Spittal in Caithness; Blackhillock Substation in Moray; and Upper Kergord on Shetland. The Shetland leg will have a power rating of 600MW; the Spittal and Blackhillock converters are rated at 800MW and 1,200MW respectively. This will be the first multi-terminal HVDC interconnection in Europe.

Project developer
The project is being developed by Scottish Hydro Electric Transmission, a subsidiary of SSE plc.

Project economics
It is estimated that it will cost more than £600million.
Another source stated cost of £660million.

The project is needed for development of Shetland's renewable energy potential and it is necessary for the projects such as the Viking Wind Farm and the Aegir wave farm.

It also contributes to the security of Shetland's electricity supply, especially as Lerwick Power Station is nearing the end of its operational life.

History
The project was proposed in 2007.  In January 2008, the report published by the Crown Estate found the project would be "economically and technically possible".  At the same year, Scottish Hydro Electric Transmission filed planning application and started public consultations.

However, the end point was moved to Caithness, and the remaining part of the connection was constructed separately as the Caithness - Moray Link.

In 2019, Ofgem announced that it was minded to authorise construction, subject to the Viking windfarm winning a CfD contract in the government auction held in September 2019. Viking Energy was unsuccessful in this auction, putting the future of the interconnector in doubt. 

SSEN submitted a revised proposal in January 2020. Ofgem carried out a final consultation on this revised proposal, and concluded in April 2020 that it would grant conditional approval for the link, conditional on Ofgem receiving sufficient evidence by the end of 2020 that the 457MW Viking Wind Farm project is likely to go ahead.

In April 2020, Ofgem approved revised proposals for the project, subject to "evidence that the Shetland Viking Wind Farm project will go ahead".

On 17 June 2020, the Viking Wind Farm sponsor, SSE Renewables, made a final investment decision to proceed with the wind farm investment, conditional on certain industry code modifications, and "the outcome of the consultation on Ofgem’s minded-to position to approve the transmission link, expected in July 2020". According to Shetland News, this meant that both the Windfarm and the HVDC Connection were "likely to go ahead".

On 16 July 2020, Ofgem gave final approval for the connection.

Contracts for construction were awarded in August 2020.

In February 2022, Hitachi Energy started the process of installing HVDC equipment at Kergord.

Installation of the subsea cable started in July 2022.

See also
 Caithness - Moray Link, the other arm of the 3-way HVDC network.
 Western Isles HVDC connection

References

External links
 HVDC Project website
 Shetland energy project website
 Map of the indicative route in Shetland (PDF)
 Map of the indicative offshore route (PDF)
 Map of the indicative route in Moray (PDF)

Electrical interconnectors to and from Great Britain
Energy in Shetland
HVDC transmission lines
North Sea energy
Proposed electric power transmission systems
Submarine power cables
Proposed electric power infrastructure in Scotland